Frig may refer to:

 Frig (Anglo-Saxon goddess), a love goddess in Anglo-Saxon paganism
 Frig (interjection), an English word
 Frig (film), a French film
 Len Frig (born 1950), Canadian ice hockey defenceman

See also
 Frigg (disambiguation)